Roza Güclü Hedin (born 1982) is a Swedish politician and former member of the Riksdag, the national legislature. A member of the Social Democratic Party, she represented Dalarna County between October 2010 and September 2018, and between January 2020 and September 2022. She has been a substitute member of the Riksdag for Peter Hultqvist twice: September 2018 to January 2022 and September 2022 to October 2022.

Güclü Hedin is the daughter of teacher Mustafa Güçül and Gülay Güçül. She was educated in Falun and studied tourism at Dalarna University College. She has worked as a social secretary in Falun Municipality since 2006. She was a member of the municipal council in Falun Municipality from 2006 to 2010.

References

1982 births
Living people
Members of the Riksdag 2010–2014
Members of the Riksdag 2014–2018
Members of the Riksdag 2018–2022
Members of the Riksdag from the Social Democrats
People from Falun Municipality
Women members of the Riksdag
21st-century Swedish women politicians